Sverigetopplistan (lit. "the Sweden top list") is the Swedish national record chart, formerly known as Topplistan (1975–1997) and Hitlistan (1998–2007) and known by its current name since October 2007, based on sales data from the Swedish Recording Industry Association (in Swedish Grammofonleverantörernas förening). Before Topplistan, music sales in Sweden were recorded by Kvällstoppen, whose weekly chart was a combined albums and singles list.

History 
For the period of 1976 to 2006, the official Swedish music charts were published by Sveriges Radio P3, a station owned by Sveriges Radio. At the end of 2006, it stopped publishing the general charts, which were entrusted to Swedish Recording Industry Association in the beginning of 2007. However, Sveriges Radio P3 continued to publish the most downloaded music charts, according to the statistics compiled by Nielsen SoundScan. The new strictly-download chart was called DigiListan.

Since late 2006, the chart has included legal downloads. The charts became the first in the world to include music streaming with singles (29 October 2010) and then with albums (2013).

From 14 November 1975 to 8 September 1993 the chart was only published every 2 weeks.

Charts

Album charts

Song charts

List of number one hits 
 List of number-one singles and albums in Sweden

See also 

 Tio i Topp - contemporary record chart between 1961 and 1974
 DigiListan - The Official Swedish Download Chart

References

External links 
Sverigetopplistan 
Swedish Charts website (contains archives)

Swedish music
Swedish record charts
1975 establishments in Sweden